The Ginger Cat and Other Lost Plays is a collection of plays by Anglo-Irish fantasy writer Lord Dunsany, edited and with an introduction by Darrell Schweitzer. It was first published, in hardcover and paperback, by Wildside Press in 2005.

Contents
The collection includes three of Dunsany's more obscure plays, only two of them previously acted and only one previously published.  The contents in full are:
"Introduction" (Darrell Schweitzer)
"The Ginger Cat," a comedy, concerning a seeming fool who takes nothing but laughter seriously, in production in summer 1914, was canceled at the outbreak of World War I 
"The Murderers," a crime melodrama, with a "twist" ending, had one known performance, in 1919, at Yale University, during a visit by the playwright, and never included in Dunsany's play collections, which were primarily of fantasies and comedies
"Mr. Faithful," another comedy, about the adventures of a man who must literally live a dog's life to marry the woman he has his heart set on, that was written in 1922, when it was also performed on the BBC; an acting edition published by Samuel French in 1935 is now a relative rarity 

The Ginger Cat was known to exist but lost for decades, and was rediscovered by Dunsany's literary curator, Joe Doyle, while Mr. Faithful was known in theatrical circles and remained in print in an acting edition for many years.  The editor reproduced the first two plays from Dunsany's manuscripts, and the third from a photocopy of the acting edition.

The editor comments that The Ginger Cat and Mr. Faithful remain funny for modern audiences, and describes them as "between Wildean and Screwball comedy."

Footnotes

External links
The Ginger Cat and Other Lost Plays at Wildside Press
Entry for The Ginger Cat and Other Lost Plays at Fantastic Fiction

2005 fiction books
1914 plays
1919 plays
1922 plays
Plays by Edward Plunkett, 18th Baron of Dunsany
Books of plays
Wildside Press books